Karivela is a festival in which many volunteers paint in black with charcoal (Kari in Malayalam language) and walk through the streets, this festival is conducted as part of other festivals, like Nemmara Vela, Kuthira Vela etc. These men usually controls the people who come to watch the festival. Kari Vela is usually seen in Palakkad District of Kerala, south India.

See also
 Nemmara Vela
 Tattamangalam Kuthira Vela
 Black face

Festivals in Palakkad district